Mount Ariel is a peak, 1,250 m, marking the south limit of Planet Heights and overlooking the north side of Uranus Glacier in the east part of Alexander Island. First mapped from air photos taken by the Ronne Antarctic Research Expedition (RARE), 1947–48, by Searle of the Falkland Islands Dependencies Survey (FIDS) in 1960. So named by the United Kingdom Antarctic Place-Names Committee (UK-APC) because of its association with Uranus Glacier, Ariel being one of the satellites of Uranus.

See also
Mount Bayonne
Mount Liszt

Mountains of Alexander Island